List of Roman Catholic priests and recusants handed over to the English authorities in the London area by James Wadsworth and his fellow pursuivants between 3 November 1640 and the summer of 1651 and as such, it is not a complete list of Roman Catholic clergymen who were executed or banished for their religion under King Charles I and then under the Commonwealth.

History
In the 1640s and early 1659 four men, Captain James Wadsworth, Francis Newton, Thomas Mayo, and Robert de Luke formed a partnership that hunted down Roman Catholics  in the London area and handed them over to the authorities for a monetary reward: "the like having not been done by any others since the reformation of religion in this nation".

List
This is a list of those handed over to the authorities by James Wadsworth and his fellow-pursuivants  between 3 November 1640 and the summer of 1651. Some were condemned, some executed, and some reprieved:

Notes

References

 
English Roman Catholics
London religion-related lists